Uncitidae is an extinct family of brachiopods.

References 

  Paleobiology Database

Prehistoric protostome families
Brachiopod families
Devonian animals
Late Devonian animals